Eugene Dennis (born 16 November 1996) is a Liberian professional footballer who plays as center-back for Ishøj IF and the Liberia national team.

Personal life
Dennis was born in Buduburam, Ghana, to Liberian refugee parents.

Club career

Hershey FC
Eugene moved to the Hershey FC in the summer 2016.

Philadelphia Lone Star FC
Eugene moved to the USL League Two club Philadelphia Lone Star FC in 2017.

Ishøj IF
On 1 February 2022, Ishøj IF announced the signing of Eugene on a one-year deal.

International career
He made his debut for Liberia in a friendly against Sierra Leone on 27 March 2022.
He played his second international game on 29 March in a 1–2 friendly loss to Burundi.
He played again for Liberia in a 2023 AFCON Qualifier against Morocco on 13 June.

References

External links 
 

  Eugene Dennis Philadelphia Lone Star FC profile

1996 births
Living people
People from Central Region (Ghana)
Liberian footballers
Liberia international footballers
Ghanaian footballers
Ghanaian people of Liberian descent
Association football defenders
Liberian expatriate sportspeople in the United States
National Premier Soccer League players